The Common Room is an interactive TV show on ITV Play. The Common Room main presenters were Tim Dixon and Emma Lee. Zö Christien also presented occasionally.

Format
The Common Room launched on ITV Play on Monday 31 July 2006. The Common Room later dropped their puzzles/quizzes and converted to a text-in format. A daily theme was usually set allowing viewers to text-in with their opinions. Pictures and videos were sent in as well. Prizes could be rewarded for the best picture/video and text—these are usually small, non-cash prizes such as an ITV Play T-shirt, a Slinky, a pen, or sometimes an electronic item such as an MP3 Player. The presenter also gave out celebrity gossip, facts or general news.

Viewers could phone, text or send an MMS to take part in the show. People's text messages were always on the screen and occasionally photos and videos were shown. On occasion the show takes a live on-air phone call with a viewer.

The first and only series of the show ended on Friday, 10 November 2006.

Studio
The set of The Common Room consisted of a green sofa with notice boards behind next to a plasma screen which isn't always visible. The presenter used a miniature electrical screen to read the texts. Alternatively, the presenter could read the screen in front of them to read the texts and view the pictures.

External links
ITV Play at itv.com

2006 British television series debuts
2006 British television series endings
ITV game shows
Phone-in quiz shows